Simon Rouby is a French director of animated films.

Biography 
Simon Rouby was born in 1980. At a very young age began to learn how to paint and sculpt. He studied drawing for two years at Ecole Emile Cohl and later decided to pursue animation at Ecole des Gobelins in Paris before leaving to study at Calarts in Los Angeles, US. These studies allowed him to direct his first short films: Blindspot and Le Présage in the same year. In 2010, he directs La Marche, another short film, produced by Naïa Productions. La Marche is selected in several animation festivals in France and abroad. In 2011, he started working with the scriptwriter Julien Lilti on the conception of his first feature film, Adama, which was released in 2015. Simon Rouby is interested in hybrid animation techniques, notably mixing sculpture with CGI modeling.

Filmography 

 2007 : Blindspot (animated short film, Gobelins)
 2007 : Le Présage (animated short film, Calarts)
 2010 : La Marche (animated short film, Naïa Productions)
 2015 : Adama (animated feature film, Naïa Productions and Pipangaï Productions)

References

External links 

 simonrouby.com
 

1980 births
Living people
French film directors